Turkey (listed as TUR) participated in the 3rd World Women's Boxing Championship held between September 25 and October 2, 2005 in Podolsk, Russia.

With thirteen women boxers participating, Turkey garnered five medals, four silver and one bronze. It ranked 9th in the unofficial medal table.

Participants
 46 kg - Derya Aktop, Ankara (TSE)
 48 kg - Gülseda Başıbütün, Ankara
 50 kg - Hasibe Erkoç, Ankara (TSE)
 52 kg - Sümeyra Kaya, İstanbul (Fenerbahçe)
 54 kg - Seda Duygu Aygün
 57 kg - Nagehan Gül, Kocaeli
 60 kg - Gülsüm Tatar, İstanbul (Fenerbahçe)
 63 kg - Elif Islak
 66 kg - Yeliz Yeşil, Ordu
 70 kg - Nurcan Çarkçı, İstanbul
 75 kg - Emine Özkan
 80 kg - Selma Yağcı, Denizli
 86 kg - Şemsi Yaralı, Ankara (TSE)

Medals

Results by event

External links
  USA Boxing

Turkey
2005 World Women's Boxing Championship
2005 in Turkish sport
2005 in Turkish women's sport